The Ford-Utilimaster Flexible Fuel Vehicle (FFV; originally designated the Carrier Route Vehicle) is an American light transport truck model, designed as a mail truck for the United States Postal Service (USPS), which is its primary user. It was built as a partnership between Ford Motor Company, which supplied a stripped-down, right-hand drive Ford Explorer chassis and drivetrain, and Utilimaster, which built the aluminum body and integrated it with the chassis. The FFV can operate with either unleaded gasoline or E85 ethanol-blended fuel using Ford's 4.0L Cologne SOHC V6 engine.

The FFV is similar in appearance to and has the same purpose as the earlier Grumman LLV; it can be distinguished from the LLV by the presence of a cargo-area window behind the street-side sliding door of the FFV.

History

The USPS solicited an offer to bid from Ford and Utilimaster in August 1998 for a fleet order of 10,000 vehicles to replace Jeep DJ-5 delivery vehicles. At the time, the phased implementation of the Energy Policy Act of 1992 required that 75% of federal fleet acquisitions were alternative fuel vehicles in fiscal year 1999. The contract was awarded a month later in September 1998; the first batch of 12 prototypes was completed and delivered for inspection within six months, by March 1999, which required Ford to retool its St. Louis Assembly Plant and Utilimaster to design and build a new body assembly plant. The prototypes were tested between March and July, and the feedback provided was incorporated into the final inspection vehicle, delivered on August 30, less than a year after the initial contract award.

The first production FFV was completed as the "USPS Carrier Route Vehicle" on December 17, 1999. The initial contract for 10,000 FFVs was completed in September 2000. In 2010, the USPS owned 21,137 FFVs, compared to 141,319 LLVs.

Technical

The right-hand drive Explorer chassis were built at Ford's St. Louis Assembly Plant, including an aluminum dash panel; the completed chassis were shipped to Utilimaster's Wakarusa, Indiana plant for final assembly. The ladder frame chassis had a C-shaped cross section and six cross-members. The cargo-area window was added to improve visibility over the LLV, especially for right-hand turns.

The FFV was equipped with a 3:55:1 final drive limited-slip rear axle, powered by the 4.0L Cologne V6 through a 5-speed automatic transmission. It rides on  steel wheels and LT195/75R15C tires.

At the time they were acquired, the only flexible fuel-capable engines were 6-cylinder types, which proved to be heavier and less fuel efficient than the 4-cylinder engines in the LLVs; in addition, E85 has less energy than gasoline, by volume, and it was estimated the USPS used  of E85 in fiscal year 2010 at a cost premium of  compared to using gasoline vehicles. In Fiscal Year 2005, it was estimated that only 1,000 of the FFVs were using E85 regularly, consuming  with a 26% decrease in fuel economy.

References

External links

United States Postal Service
Rear-wheel-drive vehicles
Trucks
Ford vehicles